Ravak may refer to:
 Ravak, Sistan and Baluchestan